Branko (Branimir) Šenoa (7 August 1879 – 4 December 1939) was a Croatian painter, graphic artist and art historian.

He was born in Zagreb, the son of the prominent writer August Šenoa. After graduating law and philosophy in Zagreb, he received his PhD in art history in 1912. He attended school of painting by Oton Iveković and a course in graphic design by Menci Clement Crnčić.

He served as the director of the Zagreb Academy of Fine Arts, and held several positions related to cultural heritage and art. He was a corresponding member of the Yugoslav Academy of Sciences and Arts.  He died, aged 60, in Zagreb.

As a painter, his work was focused on landscapes and cityscapes in etching, sceneries and illustrations.

References

1879 births
1939 deaths
Croatian art historians
Artists from Zagreb
20th-century Croatian painters
Croatian male painters
20th-century Croatian male artists
Yugoslav art historians
Yugoslav painters
Burials at Mirogoj Cemetery